The King's Damosel (also known as The King's Damsel) is a fantasy novel based on Arthurian legend by Vera Chapman first published in 1976. It served as the inspiration for the 1998 Warner Bros. film Quest for Camelot. It is part of the Three Damosels trilogy, along with The Green Knight and King Arthur's Daughter.

Plot overview
The novel follows the experiences of Lynette of Arthurian Legend after she saves her sister Leonie from the Red Knight, covering the events of the original legends as a series of flashbacks and vastly expanding Lynette's character.

Plot summary

The novel begins with the day of Lynette and her sister Leonie's dual wedding to the brothers Gaheris and Gareth, respectively. After the festivities are over, the two sisters are dragged to their bedrooms and prepared by giggling bridesmaids for the first night of their honeymoons. Lynette is miserable, as she is in fact in love with Gareth, her sister's groom, and thinks with envy of them in the next room. She is also terrified of what is about to happen, as it is revealed in a flashback that she was raped by a friend of her father's who was like a mentor to her. She is convinced that Gaheris will know that she is not a virgin, and she will be publicly shamed. However, when Gaheris finally enters the honeymoon suite, he merely comments that he does not want this, either. He sleeps next to her, without touching, and leaves before she wakes.

In another flashback, Chapman summarises the events leading up to the wedding, essentially retelling the corresponding Arthurian legend. In short, the Red Knight, a knight who claims to owe no loyalty to King Arthur, attacks Lynette's home in the absence of any male figureheads, essentially holding the household hostage until her older sister, Leonie, consents to marry him and make him Lord. Lynette disguises herself as a servant boy and escapes, going all the way to Camelot and pleading with Arthur himself to help her rescue her sister. With the help of Merlin (who had appeared to her once before, after she was raped), she receives the king's blessing, but he only sends one man with her – Gareth, who she presumes to be a kitchen boy. She is quite rude to him, feeling very resentful towards Arthur for his choice. However, Gareth soon proves himself and in the course of rescuing Leonie, Lynette realises that she has fallen in love with him. Unfortunately, upon the group's return to Camelot, it is arranged that Gareth shall marry Leonie as his reward, and Lynette shall wed Gareth's older brother, Gaheris.

After Gaheris' departure, Lynette is worried about what will happen to her – abandoned by her husband, and forced to watch the man she loves in the company of her own sister. Again Merlin intervenes, and Lynette manages to convince Arthur to make her his messenger. She is to go alone ahead of the knights to persuade unruly Lords to swear their allegiance to Arthur; it is dangerous, but she has no fear.

Lynette acts so bravely and gracefully in the course of this work that she earns the respect of all those who travel with her (including Guinevere's unlucky admirer, Lancelot). Over the course of the novel, she meets up again with the man who raped her as a teenager and beheads him; she is later haunted by his ghost, but eventually manages to forgive him, thus finally freeing herself from the terrifying black creatures which were released each time she laid a curse upon him.

She is also separated from her party in strange lands and kidnapped; she eventually finds her way out through a network of caves with the help of a very peculiar young man named Lucius. Lucius has lived in the dark so long that he is completely blind and very pale, with light blue hair. He was imprisoned along with his mother, who subsequently died, but he met a sort of witch just outside the caves who befriended him, and he is happy with his simple life. Lynette spends a considerable amount of time with the pair, and eventually falls in love with Lucius. She feels simultaneously pleased that he can not see how plain she is, and guilty because she is convinced that he would not want her if he could only see her.

Eventually, the witch sadly informs Lynette that Lucius is dying. Lynette is completely horrified, and decides that she will seek out the Holy Grail, so that Lucius can use it to save himself. She sets out with her travelling companions from before, and after a very long and decidedly strange journey, she actually manages to retrieve the Grail. She hurries back with it to Lucius, resolving that she will let him do with it as he pleases. Upon receiving the Grail, Lucius wishes for sight rather than life, so that he can finally see Lynette. Upon opening his eyes, he cries out with delight, telling the startled (and heartbroken) Lynette that she's beautiful over and over.

The pair have a little more time together, which Lynette tries very hard to make the best of. Lucius dies, and she and the witch bury him before she sets out once again, to resume her post as the King's Damosel.

Film adaptation
In 1998, Warner Bros. released an animated film titled Quest for Camelot, which is loosely based upon Chapman's novel. Significant changes were made to the plot and themes of the story, including the following:

 Lynette is renamed Kayley; she has no older sister, and is trying to save her mother from Ruber by retrieving Excalibur and warning Arthur of the impending attack on Camelot.
 The darker elements of Lynette/Kayley's childhood, including her rape, are absent. Instead, she has a seemingly perfect childhood up until her father is killed by Ruber. In both versions, she is portrayed as a tomboy who has more interest in horseback riding and combat than more "ladylike" pursuits.
 The characters of Gareth and Lucius are combined into that of Garrett, a blind hermit who dreamed of becoming a knight prior to his accidental blinding who accompanies Kayley on her adventure, albeit reluctantly. In both versions, Gareth/Garrett surprises Lynette/Kayley by turning out to be more than he seemed (Lynette assumed Gareth was a kitchen boy; Kayley initially doesn't realise that Garrett is blind, and is surprised to learn he knew her father), though in the movie she is far nicer to him than in the original legend.
 The Red Knight is replaced by Ruber, a former Knight of the Round Table who wishes to steal Excalibur and usurp the throne.
 The movie added several trademark elements of children's animation, including several "talking animal sidekicks" (Devon and Cornwall, Bladebeak, Ruber's griffin and Ayden, though Ayden is the exception in that he doesn't speak but displays a human-like personality) and musical numbers.

External links
 https://web.archive.org/web/20070208180112/http://www.tolkiensociety.org/ts_info/folk/vera-chapman.html

1976 British novels
Modern Arthurian fiction
British fantasy novels
British historical novels
British novels adapted into films